National Museum of Ethnology may refer to:

National Museum of Ethnology (Japan)
National Museum of Ethnology (Netherlands)
National Museum of Ethnology (Portugal)